Bir Moghrein Airport  is an airport serving Bir Moghrein, a city in the Tiris Zemmour region of Mauritania.

References

External links
 

Airports in Mauritania
Tiris Zemmour Region